Rožaje is a town in northeastern Montenegro.

As of 2011, the city has a population of 9,567 inhabitants.

Surrounded by hills to its west and mountains to its east (notably Mount Hajla), the town is divided in half by, and contains the source of the river Ibar, which gives its name to the local sports clubs FK Ibar, KK Ibar and OK Ibar. Rožaje is the centre of the Rožaje Municipality within the 24 municipalities of Montenegro.

Rožaje annually celebrates its foundation day on September 30.

History
Rožaje was first settled in antiquity by the Illyrians. Evidence of this Illyrian settlement is located on Brezojevica Hill. Later, during the migration of the Slavs, Slavs settled in the area. Rožaje was first mentioned in 1571 and 1585. The settlement surrounding the then fort was called Trgovište, which it was called until 1912. 

During the Ottoman Empire's reign over Montenegro, the Sultan Murat II Mosque was constructed in the city in the 1500s, which also contains the turbe of the sultan's body. It is considered to be the oldest mosque in the entire city.

In 1700, after the Great Serb Migration, the Albanian clans of the Kelmendi and Kuçi and other tribes like the Shkreli of Rugova established themselves in the region of Rožaje and the neighboring town of Tutin in Serbia. The Shala, Krasniqi, and Gashi also moved in the region.

In 1797, the Ganić kula, a defensive tower was built from the Muslim side of the Kuči, as they supported the Muslim authority and cultural practices, was built. Nowadays, the tower is currently the town's museum.

During World War I, the army of the Kingdom of Montenegro captured the city in 1912 from the Ottoman Empire, during the First Balkan War. Within this time, the Montenegrin Army under King Nikola quickly sought to Serbianize the population, to reduce threats of invasions or uprisings by the Albanian locals. It was officially ceded to Montenegro following the Treaty of London in 1913 that ended the war. In 1917, the local Albanian qadi Bajram Balota organised a force of irregulars in the territory held by Austria-Hungary in Montenegro around Berane and Rožaje, with his soldiers and allies persecuting and killing Orthodox Montenegrins. His movement was dissolved following a defeat by Austro-Hungarian soldiers on June 18th, 1918. In 1919, after the war, Rožaje was one of the main cities that participated in an Albanian revolt, which later came to be known as the Plav Rebellion (Montenegrin: Plavskog Pobuna), rising up together with the Plav and Gusinje districts and fighting against the inclusion of Sandzak in the Kingdom of Serbs, Croats and Slovenes. An estimated 700 Albanians were killed in Rožaje by the Serbian army when the rebellion was quelled. These events resulted in a large influx of Albanians migrating to Albania.

During World War II, the city has seen conflict between the Yugoslav Partisans, the Chetniks, the Sandžak Muslim Militia, and the Albanian Vulnetari. Mullah Jakup Kardović, who would end up being a prominent commander of the Militia and would participate in the Battle for Novi Pazar, came from the village of Biševo, which is 4–5km away from the city.

After World War II, the city of Rožaje became a part of SR Montenegro, which was ultimately a part of the SFR Yugoslavia. Within this time period, the municipality of Rožaje did not exist, as it was a part of the Ivangrad (now Berane) municipality at the time. During the 1960s, the authorities established the Gornji Ibar company, which was a woodworking/lumber/furniture assembling factory. At one point, the company employed more than 53% of the entire city. It expanded the economic status of the city, and became a focal point for woodworking within the region.

In 1992, the Gornji Ibar company was liquidated and subsequently went out of business, which left the city in economic turmoil. 

During the Bosnian War, the Bosniaks of Foča who managed to escape the massacre that happened in the area resettled in Rožaje.

During the Kosovo War in 1999, around 1,000 ethnic Albanians that also managed to escape the war settled in the south of Rožaje. They were mostly from the regions of Drenica and Mitrovica. 

In 2018, a replica of the Sebilj in Sarajevo has been completed and is currently displayed in the town's main square.

As Rožaje is one of the only Muslim-majority municipalities, it has several mosques within the city, two notable ones being the Kučanska Džamija (in English: House Mosque) and the other being the Sultan Murat II mosque. However, there are 2 Orthodox churches that can found in the municipality, with the ruined Ružica church and Gospođin vrh church allegedly built by the wife of the Serbian king Uroš I.

Geography

The municipality is situated on large hills, with the mountains Hajla, Mokra Gora, Ahmica, Krstac, Žljeb, Štedim and Turjak to its east and southeast. Those mountains belong to the northern part of the Accursed Mountains range. The Ibar River flows through it and forests cover the entire region. Thanks to the river, there are abundant sources of large forests, arable pastures and meadows within the municipality.  During the winter months, the surrounding mountains experience a major cold front, with snow and ice being very common. The Koppen Climate has been recorded as Cfb, or a marine climate. The city stands at around 1,014m or 3,326ft above sea level.

Demographics
Rožaje is the administrative centre of the Rožaje municipality, which has a total of 23,312 residents. The town of Rožaje itself has a population of 9,567 in 2011. Rožaje is also considered to be the centre for the Bosniak community of Montenegro. Bosniaks form the majority in both the town and the municipality itself.

Ethnic Albanians, not to mention the present-day descendants of the above-mentioned clans that have settled in the municipality, have been present within the city, as well as the outskirts, especially villages that are close to the border of Kosovo (such as Dacići, Balotići, Plumci, Bać, Besnik, etc). They enjoy and support mutual relations with the Bosniaks and other ethnicities within the city and have also become an integral part of Rožaje's society. The current population of Albanians living in Rožaje rounds up to 1,200, forming 5% of the total population in 2011. 

Albeit very small, the Serbs have also lived in Rožaje for some time. Bijela Crkva is one of the only Serb-majority villages within the municipality. 

There are 2 major neighbourhoods within the municipality, Ibarac, and Bandžovo Brdo. Ibarac is split between Lijevna Obala Ibar and Desna Obala Ibar. 

The population of Rožaje from 1948 to 2011 is as shown below:

The ethnicity and language of Municipality of Rožaje is as shown below:

Transport

Rožaje is situated on the main road connecting Montenegro with Kosovo, known as the Rožaje-Kula-Peć road (Kula being the border post between Montenegro and Kosovo on both sides). It also has a link with Novi Pazar in Central Serbia. The IB-22 Highway (otherwise known as the Ibarska magistrala) is the main regional road that connects Montenegro with Serbia.

However, due to the opening of the Bar-Boljare motorway in November of 2021, the time from getting to Rožaje from Podgorica has greatly reduced, and is slowly becoming more preferred over the earlier option for most of the diaspora from other countries.

International relations

Twin towns — Sister cities
Rožaje is twinned with:

 Bayrampaşa, Turkey
 Betton, France
 Kavadarci, North Macedonia
 Kütahya, Turkey
 Pernik, Bulgaria
 Pfäffikon, Switzerland

Gallery

Sources

References

Bibliography

External links
 Rožaje official web site
 Rožaje main web portal

 
Populated places in Rožaje Municipality
Sandžak